Brooklyn Heights is a village in Cuyahoga County, Ohio, United States. The population was 1,543 at the 2010 census.

Geography
The southern part of the city is dominated by a heavily wooded valley with a creek running through the middle of it. Otherwise, the remainder of Brooklyn Heights is developed land, consisting primarily of detached housing.

Brooklyn Heights is the location of the Cleveland office of the National Weather Service.

Demographics

2010 census
As of the census of 2010, there were 1,543 people, 595 households, and 436 families living in the village. The racial makeup of the village was 94.6% White, 1.2% African American, 0.6% Native American, 1.7% Asian, 0.4% from other races, and 1.6% from two or more races. Hispanic or Latino of any race were 2.5% of the population.

There were 595 households, of which 32.3% had children under the age of 18 living with them, 55.8% were married couples living together, 13.4% had a female householder with no husband present, 4.0% had a male householder with no wife present, and 26.7% were non-families. 23.5% of all households were made up of individuals, and 12.5% had someone living alone who was 65 years of age or older. The average household size was 2.58 and the average family size was 3.06.

The median age in the village was 43.6 years. 23.7% of residents were under the age of 18; 7.5% were between the ages of 18 and 24; 20.8% were from 25 to 44; 30.9% were from 45 to 64; and 17.1% were 65 years of age or older. The gender makeup of the village was 47.2% male and 52.8% female.

2000 census
As of the census of 2000, there were 1,558 people, 594 households, and 437 families living in the village. The population density was 878.7 people per square mile (339.9/km2). There were 607 housing units at an average density of 342.3 per square mile (132.4/km2). The racial makeup of the village was 97.30% White, 0.77% African American, 0.13% Native American, 0.71% Asian, 0.51% from other races, and 0.58% from two or more races. Hispanic or Latino of any race were 1.35% of the population.

There were 594 households, out of which 31.8% had children under the age of 18 living with them, 59.3% were married couples living together, 10.8% had a female householder with no husband present, and 26.3% were non-families. 23.2% of all households were made up of individuals, and 13.5% had someone living alone who was 65 years of age or older. The average household size was 2.60 and the average family size was 3.08.

In the village, the population was spread out, with 24.8% under the age of 18, 5.5% from 18 to 24, 26.3% from 25 to 44, 25.2% from 45 to 64, and 18.3% who were 65 years of age or older. The median age was 42 years. For every 100 females there were 92.8 males. For every 100 females age 18 and over, there were 89.3 males.

The median income for a household in the village was $47,847, and the median income for a family was $62,424. Males had a median income of $50,689 versus $33,182 for females. The per capita income for the village was $27,012. About 1.5% of families and 2.2% of the population were below the poverty line, including none of those under age 18 and 8.7% of those age 65 or over.

Government
Brooklyn Heights employs a standard council-based municipal government, which as of October 1, 2021 consisted of the following positions and occupants:

 Mayor: Michael S. Procuk
 Council (of 5 members):
 Joe Blados
 Ray Berzins
 Mark Lasky 
 Jennifer Presot - President Pro Tem
 Matt Walsh

References

External links
 Village website

Villages in Cuyahoga County, Ohio
Villages in Ohio